Jjigae (Korean: 찌개) is a popular Korean stew. There are many varieties; it is typically made with meat, seafood or vegetables in a broth seasoned with gochujang (red chilli paste), doenjang (soy bean paste), ganjang (soy sauce) or saeujeot (salted seafood). Jjigae is usually served in a communal dish, boiling hot.

A Korean meal almost always includes either a jjigae or a guk. During the Joseon dynasty, it was known as jochi, and two varieties would always be present on the King's surasang.

The types of jjigae are often named according to their principal ingredients, such as saengseon jjigae (생선찌개) made from fish or dubu jjigae (두부찌개) made from tofu, or according to their broth and seasonings like gochujang jjigae (고추장찌개) or doenjang jjigae (된장찌개).

Varieties

By ingredient

 Altang, made with pollock roe
 Dubu jjigae, made with firm tofu
 Ge jjigae, made with crab
 Kimchi jjigae, made with kimchi and other ingredients
 Kongbiji jjigae, made with soybeans
 Budae jjigae, made with a spicy broth and assorted meats and other ingredients
 Saengseon jjigae, made with fish. Dongtae jjigae (동태 찌개) is made from frozen pollock.
 Sundubu jjigae, made with uncurdled soft tofu

By condiment
Doenjang jjigae, made with a doenjang broth
Cheonggukjang jjigae, made with cheonggukjang and other ingredients
Saeujeot jjigae, made with saeujeot
Gochujang jjigae, made with "gochujang" broth, usually including pork
Myeongranjeot jjigae, made with myeongran jeot (salted fermented roe)

See also

 Fish stew
 Korean cuisine
 List of soups
 List of stews

References

Korean words and phrases
Korean soups and stews